Raúl Mora (born 10 April 1969) is a Cuban weightlifter. He competed in the men's middleweight event at the 1992 Summer Olympics.

References

1969 births
Living people
Cuban male weightlifters
Olympic weightlifters of Cuba
Weightlifters at the 1992 Summer Olympics
Sportspeople from Santiago de Cuba
Pan American Games medalists in weightlifting
Pan American Games gold medalists for Cuba
Central American and Caribbean Games medalists in weightlifting
Weightlifters at the 1987 Pan American Games
20th-century Cuban people